Yu Rong (郁蓉) is a Chinese illustrator of children's picture books, especially known for her use of papercutting artwork.

Biography 
Born in China, Yu Rong first trained as a primary school teacher, then studied for a BA in Chinese Painting and Contemporary Art Design (Nanjing Normal University's Art College) and an MA in Communication and Design (Royal College of Art, London). She now lives near Cambridge, UK.

Awards, honours, exhibitions 

 1999 - The Folio Society Illustration Awards
 1999 - The Quentin Blake Award for Narrative Illustration
 2000 - RCA Graduating Students Book Awards, RCA Final Degree Show
 2000 - RCA Sheila Robinson Drawing Prize
 2001&2002 - Contemporary Decorative Arts Exhibition, Sotheby's 
 2008 - American Library Association (ALA) - Notable Children's Book
 2013 - Biennial of Illustration Bratislava (BIB) - Golden Apple Award - for Free as a Cloud
 2013 - China's 8th National Book Design Exhibition - Best book in children's book category - for Free as a Cloud
 2013 - Shanghai International Children's Bookfair Golden Pinwheel Awards Grand Jury Prize and Reader's Choice Prize - for Free as a Cloud
 2015 - Chen Bochui International Children's Literature Award - best picture book - for Smoke
 2015 - Chinese Original Picture Books Top 20 - first prize - for Summer
 2016 - Serbia International Bookfair - Illustration Award - for Smoke
 2016 - Shenzhen Children's Library Top 10 My Favorite Children's Books - for Summer
 2017 - Nami Island International Picture Book Illustration Concours 2017 Purple Island Award - for Smoke

Works 
 A Lovely Day for Amelia Goose (2004)
 Tracks of a Panda, with Nick Dowson (2007
 Smoke, with Cao Wenxuan, tr. Duncan Poupard 《烟》 (2016)
 Snowflake in My Pocket, with Rachel Bright (2016)
 Free as a Cloud, with Bai Bing 《云朵一样的八哥》 (2017)
 I am Hua Mulan, with Qin Wenjun 《我是花木兰》 (Reycraft, 2019)
 Summer, with Cao Wenxuan, tr. Yan Ding) 《夏天》 (Macmillan, 2019)
 Dou Dou the Panda series, with Gao Hongbo, Jin Bo and Bai Bing 《熊猫逗逗系列》 (2019)
 Sweet Snow series, with Tie Ning 《香雪系列》 (2020)
 Gan Gan the Squirrel series, with Fang Suzhen 《松鼠干干系列》 (2020)
 Li Na, Being a Better Me, with A Jia 《李娜，做更好的自己》 (2020)
 Rope, with Cao Wenxuan) 《绳子》 (2020)
 Footprints, with Xue Tao) 《脚印》 (2020)
 Shulin's Grandpa, with Matt Goodfellow 《舒琳的外公》 (Otter-Barry, 2021)
 The Child that Lost Its Way, with Jin Bo 《迷路的小孩》 (2021)
 The Visible Sounds. Picture book, with Yin Jianling, tr. Filip Selucky (UClan, 2021)

References

External links 

 Yu Rong on Youtube
 Yu Rong on Chinese Books for Young Readers

Living people
Chinese children's book illustrators
Chinese children's writers
Chinese women children's writers
Chinese women illustrators
Alumni of the Royal College of Art
Year of birth missing (living people)
Nanjing Normal University alumni